Mardikian is an Armenian surname. Notable people with the surname include:

George Mardikian (1903–1977), Armenian restaurateur, chef, writer and philanthropist
Kevork Mardikian (born 1954), Syrian footballer
Mardik Mardikian (born 1992), Syrian footballer

See also 
 Mardik

Armenian-language surnames